Navarro is a town in Buenos Aires Province, Argentina. It is the county seat of Navarro Partido.

External links

 Municipal website

Populated places in Buenos Aires Province
Populated places established in 1864